Rudolf Senti (4 January 1898 – 17 January 1958) was a Liechtenstein sports shooter. He competed in the 50 m rifle event at the 1936 Summer Olympics.

References

1898 births
1958 deaths
Liechtenstein male sport shooters
Olympic shooters of Liechtenstein
Shooters at the 1936 Summer Olympics
Place of birth missing